The Eighty-Ninth Arkansas General Assembly was the legislative body of the state of Arkansas in 2013 and 2014. In this General Assembly, the Arkansas Senate and Arkansas House of Representatives were both controlled by the Republicans. In the Senate, 21 senators were Republicans and 14 were Democrats. In the House, 69 representatives were Republicans, 30 were Democrats, and one was independent. The 89th General Assembly was the first time both chambers were controlled by Republicans since the Reconstruction era.

Sessions
The Regular Session of the 89th General Assembly opened on January 14, 2013.

It adjourned sine die May 1, 2014 and was immediately followed the First Extraordinary Session.

Major events

Vacancies
 Senator Paul Bookout (D-21st) resigned January 29, 2014, following an investigation finding he spent campaign funds on personal expenses. He was replaced by John Cooper (R) via special election on January 29, 2014.
 Lieutenant Governor Mark Darr (R), resigned February 1, 2014 under threat of impeachment following an investigation finding campaign and office spending ethics violations. The lieutenant governor presides as President of the Senate, but only casts tiebreaking votes. The position remained vacant through the fiscal session until the November 2014 elections. The entire staff of the lieutenant governor's office resigned days after President Pro Tem Michael Lamoureux (R-16th) sought control over the office staff.

Senate

Leadership

Officers

Floor Leaders

Senators

House of Representatives

Leadership

Officers

The Democratically-controlled 88th General Assembly elected Darrin Williams (D-26th) as speaker-designate for the 89th General Assembly. He was challenged by Terry Rice (R-21st), but won the speaker-designate election on a party line vote. When the Republicans claimed control of the House in the November 2012 elections, the House voted to vacate the prior speaker-designate election and re-open nominations. Davy Carter (R-43rd) defeated Rice to become the first Republican Speaker since the Reconstruction era.

Floor Leaders

Representatives

References

Arkansas legislative sessions
2013 U.S. legislative sessions
2014 U.S. legislative sessions
2013 in Arkansas
2014 in Arkansas